This article refers to crime in the U.S. state of Indiana.

State statistics
In 2008, there were 223,994 crimes reported in Indiana, including 327 murders.

Policing 

In 2008, Indiana had 482 state and local law enforcement agencies. Those agencies employed a total of 19,940 staff. Of the total staff, 13,171 were sworn officers (defined as those with general arrest powers).

Police ratio 

In 2008, Indiana had 206 police officers per 100,000 residents.

Capital punishment laws

Capital punishment is applied in this state.

References

External links
Indiana execution chamber photo